JS Kongō (DDG-173) is a  guided missile destroyer in the Japan Maritime Self-Defense Force (JMSDF). Kongō is the third Japanese naval vessel named after Mount Kongō. She was laid down by Mitsubishi Heavy Industries in Nagasaki, Nagasaki on 8 May 1990. Launching ceremony happened on 26 September 1991 and she was commissioned on 25 March 1993. She was the first ship outside of the United States to feature the Aegis combat system and its  ballistic missile defense capability.

Operational history 

Kongō was laid down on 8 May 1990 at Mitsubishi Heavy Industries Nagasaki Shipyard's Yaijima Plant as a 7200-ton destroyer planned in 1988 based on the medium-term defense improvement plan. She was launched on 26 September 1991 and commissioned on 25 March 1993. Overall, The construction cost was 122.3 billion yen. As the lead ship, she was the only one in her class not to have the ORQ-1 helicopter data link installed at the time of commissioning, which was installed later along with the antenna of Link 16.

From 26 November 1993 to 21 February 1994 she was dispatched to Hawaii for the Aegis System Equipment Qualification Test (SQT). Later that year, she participated in RIMPAC between 23 June and 6 July, also around Hawaii.
She also participated in RIMPAC 2000, accompanied by a large JMSDF fleet consisting of the destroyers Kurama, Shimakaze, Murasame, Harusame, Yūdachi, Kirisame,  Asagiri, as well as the supply ship  Hamana and submarine  Natusushio. During the exercise Kongō successfully intercepted 3 simulated missiles and an F-16 with her SM-2 Surface-to-air missiles.

She was deployed to the Indian Ocean between 17 May and 19 September 2004 in response to the passing of the "Act on Special Measures Against Terrorism", alongside the Ariake and Hamana.

In November 2006 she was dry-docked at Mitsubishi Heavy Industries Nagasaki Shipyard for inspection and modified to carry the SM-3 block IA, which was completed by March 2007 and inspections finished by August. On 15 October of the same year, she was stationed near Hawaii for the purpose of MD system testing, and succeeded in tracking two targets during an interception test with the US Navy Ticonderoga-class cruiser USS Lake Erie on 6 November. On 15 November, she succeeded in tracking a separated target during ballistic missile target tracking training.  In December 2007, Japan conducted a successful test of the SM-3 block IA against a ballistic missile aboard Kongō. This was the first time a Japanese ship was selected to launch the interceptor missile during a test of the Aegis Ballistic Missile Defense System. In previous tests they provided tracking and communications.

In 2012, Kongō, along with Chōkai and Myōkō were deployed in cooperation with the US Navy in preparation for the Democratic Republic of Korea to test the Kwangmyŏngsŏng-3 Unit 2. However, the ships were withdrawn after the satellite did not violate Japanese airspace.

In April 2013 she was again sortied in response to the launching of a North Korean missile launch, returning to Sasebo on 30 June.

As of April 2020, Kongō is based in Sasebo, Nagasaki.

Gallery

References

External links
GlobalSecurity.org; JMSDF DDG Kongo Class
MaritimeQuest photo gallery: Kongo

Kongō-class destroyers
1991 ships
Kongō